The following is an incomplete list of major wars fought by Mongolia, by Mongolian people or regular armies during periods when independent Mongolian states existed, from antiquity to the present day.

The list gives the name, the date, combatants, and the result of these conflicts following this legend:



Xiongnu 
This section contains list of wars involving Xiongnu and its state located on the territory of modern Mongolia.

Mongolian Tribes 
This section contains list of wars involving Xianbei, Wuhuan, Wusun and other Mongol tribes.

Rouran Khaganate 
This section contains list of wars involving Rouran Khaganate

Khitan Empire/Liao Dynasty 
This section contains list of wars involving Liao Dynasty

Mongol Empire 
This section contains list of wars involving Mongol Empire

Mongolian States 
This section contains list of wars involving different Mongolian states existed between the 13th and 14th centuries.

Post-imperial Mongolia 
This section contains list of wars involving different post-imperial Mongolian states (Northern Yuan Dynasty, Dzungar Khanate, Four Oirat)

Dzungar Khanate 
This section contains list of wars major battles involving Dzungar khanate

Beginning of the 20th century 
This section contains list of wars and major battlesinvolving different Mongolian states that existed in the first four decades of the 20th century (Mongolia (1911–1924), Buryat-Mongolia, Uryankhay Republic).

Mongolian People's Republic 
This section contains list of wars involving Mongolian People's Republic.

Sources 
 https://web.archive.org/web/20160721035626/http://www.legendtour.ru/rus/mongolia/history/history.shtml
 http://gumilevica.kulichki.net/HPH/index.html

References

Wars
Mongolia